Hans-Günther Schmidt (24 September 1942 – 5 February 2023) was a Romanian-born German handball player of Banat Swabian origin.

The son of a medical doctor, and an athletic prodigy (when he was twelve he played already for the local handball team), Schmidt became Romanian national high school champion in shot put. After playing for Știința Timișoara and Știința Bucharest, he transferred to Steaua Bucharest, the military team.

Schmidt defected from Romania to West Germany when he was 21 years old during a match tour with the Romanian national youth team. Being a member of the military, he was sentenced to death for desertion.

In seven out of twelve German championships which VfL Gummersbach won in the Handball-Bundesliga, Hansi Schmidt played a crucial role as a goal scorer and playmaker. All in all, he played in ten finals for the German championship. Between 1967 and 1972 he became six times in a row top goal scorer of the Bundesliga's Northern League, the first five times also of the Bundesliga itself. In 1975 he became again top goal scorer of the Northern League.

In 2008 he was named one of the VfL's "All-Star-Team“.

Considered to be the inventor of the delayed jump shot in handball, he worked as a coach, and later as a physical education teacher, after retiring from active play. 

Schmidt was married and had two children. He died on 5 February 2023, at the age of 80.

Clubs 
 1959–1961 Știința Timișoara (Romanian first league)
 1961 Știința Bucharest
 1961–1963 Steaua Bucharest
 1964–1976 VfL Gummersbach
 1976–1979 TB Wülfrath
 TV Gelpetal (as a coach)
 1981–1982 TuS Derschlag/playing coach

Results 
 1959 Romanian indoor handball youth champion
 1963 Romanian indoor champion with Steaua Bucharest
 1966, 1967, 1969, 1973 till 1976 seven times German indoor handball champion with VfL Gummersbach
 1967, 1970, 1971 and 1974 four times EHF Champions League winner with mit dem VfL Gummersbach
 Seven times top goal scorer of the Bundesliga's Northern League (1967–1972 and 1975)
 173 Bundesliga games played, 1066 scored goals
 338 goals in 53 EHF Champions League games
 18 national team appearances for Romania
 98 national games for Germany, 484 goals scored
 3 nominations to the World Team

Awards 
 Silbernes Lorbeerblatt
 Sports Badge of Nordrhein-Westfalen
 Little Gold Medal of Gummersbach, 2006

References 

 Johann Steiner, Hansi Schmidt. Weltklasse auf der Königsposition. Biographie eines Handballers, Verlag Gilde & Köster, Troisdorf 2005, .
 Johann Steiner, Handball-Geschichte(n). Siebenbürger Sachsen und Banater Schwaben ebnen Rumänien den Weg zu sieben Weltmeistertiteln, ADZ-Verlag, Bucharest 2003,

External links 
Hansi Schmidt wird 60! 

1942 births
2023 deaths
People from Timiș County
Danube-Swabian people
West German male handball players
CSA Steaua București (handball) players
VfL Gummersbach players
Romanian defectors
German people of German-Romanian descent
Romanian male handball players
People sentenced to death in absentia